Carol Weihrer (born c. 1951) is an activist for victims of anesthesia awareness. Beginning in 1989, Weihrer had chronic pain from recurrent corneal erosion syndrome. After 14 unsuccessful surgeries to relieve the increasing severity of the pain, in 1998 she underwent an enucleation of the eye and reportedly woke up from anesthesia during the procedure. Although she didn't feel any pain during the surgery, she remembered the entire experience afterwards. Weihrer received an out of court settlement and maintains that she has post-traumatic stress disorder as result of her experience.

References

External links
 Anesthesiology Newsletter - West Virginia University - Dr. Robert E. Johnstone's review of a speaking engagement by Weiher
 CBSNews.com. Waking Up During Surgery. Nov. 24, 2003.
 Columbia News Service. Waking up during surgery: a living nightmare. March 1, 2004.

1951 births
Living people
American health activists
Anesthesia